Do It Again may refer to:

Film and television
 Do It Again (film), a 2010 documentary film

Music

Albums
 Do It Again (Gabrielle album), 2021
 Do It Again: A Tribute to Pet Sounds, a Beach Boys tribute album, 2006
 Do It Again (EP), by Röyksopp and Robyn, or the title song (see below), 2014

Songs
 "Do It Again" (The Beach Boys song), 1968
 "Do It Again" (Cassie Davis song), 2009
 "Do It Again" (The Chemical Brothers song), 2007
 "Do It Again" (Elevation Worship song), 2016
 "Do It Again" (George Gershwin and Buddy DeSylva song), 1922
 "Do It Again" (The Kinks song), 1984
 "Do It Again" (NLE Choppa song), 2022
 "Do It Again" (Pia Mia song), 2015
 "Do It Again" (Röyksopp and Robyn song), 2014
 "Do It Again" (Steely Dan song), 1972
 "Do It Again" (Swami song), 2014
 "Do It Again (Put Ya Hands Up)", by Jay-Z, 1999
 "Do It Again", written by Irving Berlin, 1912
 "Do It Again", by Air Supply from The Whole Thing's Started, 1977
 "Do It Again", by Chris Brown from Fortune, 2012
 "Do It Again", by Holy Ghost! from Holy Ghost!, 2011
 "Do It Again", by Israel Cruz, 2007
 "Do It Again", by Kylie Minogue, a B-side of the singles "In My Arms" and "Wow", 2008
 "Do It Again", by Lil Boosie from Incarcerated, 2010
 "Do It Again", by No Rome, 2018
 "Do It Again", by Queens of the Stone Age from Songs for the Deaf, 2002
 "Do It Again", by R5 from Sometime Last Night, 2015
 "Do It Again", by Status Quo from Heavy Traffic, 2002
 "Do It Again", by The Ting Tings from Super Critical, 2014

See also
 "Do It, Do It Again", an English version of "A far l'amore comincia tu", by Raffaella Carrà, 1977
 Did It Again (disambiguation)
 Let's Do It Again (disambiguation)